Spirit of the Forest, is a 2008 Spanish computer-animated family film by Dygra Films and sequel to The Living Forest. The film was released in Spain on September 12, 2008.

Premise
Mrs. D'Abondo wants the forest of the living trees to be cut down to make way for a highway, but Furi, Cebolo, Tigre and other animals manage to defeat her to save it.

Voice cast
The voice cast of the English speaking version includes:
Sean Astin as Furi
Giovanni Ribisi as Cebolo
Ron Perlman as Oak
Anjelica Huston as Mrs. D'Abondo

Additional voices
Nevertheless, most of the voice production for this film was recorded in London at St Anne's Court, now part of Ascent Media. English voices include talented actors such as
Tom Clark-Hill as Eucalyptus, Tigre, Mr. D'Abondo and Triston
Jo Wyatt as Pearl
Eric Meyers as Rosendo and Rodemor
Laurence Bouvard as Linda and Baby
Martin T. Sherman as Hu-Hu and Piorno
Stefan Ashton Frank as Hoho, Magnate and Cuscus
Laurel Lefkow as Holm Oak and Sabela
Stéphane Cornicard as Twins
Glenn Wrage as Gordo and Pine

Recording sessions were cast and directed by Xevi Fernandez, who specialises in Spanish-English-Spanish film dubbing. The cast of actors (above) were recorded in Hollywood.

References

External links
 
 
 
 Hollywood Reporter article

2008 films
Spanish computer-animated films
2000s Spanish-language films
2000s children's animated films
2008 computer-animated films
2000s English-language films
2000s Spanish films